Matemateca (Matemateca IME-USP) is a collection of objects related to mathematics and mathematics teaching that is housed in the Institute of Mathematics and Statistics of the University of São Paulo. It is an initiative that dates to 2003, when professors connected to IME mobilized and counted with the support of Pró-Reitorias de Graduação e de Cultura e Extensão da Universidade de São Paulo and CNPQ (National Research Council) to organize the collection. Matemateca organizes exhibitions open to the public.

The professors in the Department of Mathematics of IME-USP (Institute of Mathematics and Statistics of the University of São Paulo) who initiated the project were Deborah Raphael, Eduardo Colli, and Sônia Garcia; Artur Simões Rozestraten from the Laboratory for Models and Tests (LAME) in the Department of Architectural Technology of the FAU-USP ( Faculty of Architecture and Urbanism of the University of São Paulo) partners with the IME.

History 

In August 2002 the French itinerant exhibition of the Cité des sciences et de I'industrie, visited IME, causing in some teachers the desire of building a collection with the purpose of divulging to students of the exact area mathematical contents that are not covered in graduation courses. Matemateca's debut took place during the First Week of Graduation of the Institute of Mathematics and Statistics of the University of São Paulo (IME). Then it was taken to Salvador, Bahia, in order to be exhibited in the II Bienal da Sociedade Brasileira de Matemática. A presentation in Rio de Janeiro, at the IV World Congress of Science Centers, in conjunction with the  USP's Science Station, showed the organizers the potential of the collection for the general public, especially students of all levels. The project began to aim at the popularization of mathematics, giving preference to interactive objects that could be approached by means of direct challenges to the visitor. As a way to expand the field of access, Matemateca participated in an upload drive to Wikimedia Commons of some digital images belonging to the collection, under the free Creative Commons Attribution-Share Alike 4.0 International license.

Collection 

Matemateca's collection is divided in approximately forty different themes that include equations and functions among other mathematical and statistical concepts. The visitors, be them USP students, family members, teachers or students from other schools and colleges are granted full permission to handle all the exposed content, thus allowing and encouraging an interactive experiential learning. Some items can be seen below.

 Chladni figures
 Plates made of metal, in various formats, covered with sawdust, which, when suffering interference from the musical notes emitted by the playing of a violin bow, spreads and forms geometric figures.
 Chaotic Water Wheel
 Made by undergraduate students, in a course taught by two professors from the Mathematics Department of IME and a professor from the FAU|, the chaotic water wheel is composed of a wheel made of acrylic material, vertically positioned together with several glasses, thus exerting an unpredictable spinning movement, always alternating sides. The work manifests the chaos, seen in the theory of dynamic systems 
 Rocker
 Having the official name of harmonograph, the structure known as Balancette, an analogy to the swings in parks, is composed of a surface covered with sulphite paper, and is then set in motion so that a pen, fixed to a wooden rod, makes drawings on the sheet by means of the swing.
 Surface topology
 Retraction in which if two surfaces, when undergoing deformation and take equal shapes without breaking, will be considered similar.
 Regulated Surfaces
 Refers to curved structures, which contain in their composition only straight lines.
 Double pendulum and the Butterfly Effect
 Articulated Arms
 Anamorphosis of the Mirrored Cylinder
 Centre of Mass of Plane Figures
 Algebraic Topology
 Theory of Nodes and Links
 Convex Polyhedra and Regular Faces
 Calculating Rulers
 Tiling
 Flexible Polyhedra
 Equidecon Ponibility
 Soap Films
 Geometry in the Sphere
 Reuleaux triangle
 Ellipsographs
 Symmetries of the Cube
 The Hex Game
 Descending Washers
 The Rising Cone
 Steiner Trees
 Mountains of Sand
 The Tautocronous Ramp
 The Summing Machine - Base 2
 The Harmonic Series
 Toothed Wheels
 Galton's Board
 The Olympic Revenge Game
 The Monigsberg Bridges
 Three-Dimensional Old Woman's Game
 Icosian
 What's in the Rattles?
 Non-transitive Dice
 The Secret Santa draw
 The impossible triangle
 Breaking Symmetry
 Symmetry Machines
 Polyhedra

Exhibition history 

Due to a lack of space at USP for continuous exhibition, the collection is stored and is presented when and where the opportunity arises, in itinerant fashion.

 USP São Carlos: short season, October 1-11, at the Center for Scientific and Cultural Disclosure (CDCC).
 State University of Campinas: October 2012, at the UNICAMP Exploratory Science Museum.
 IME-USP: 12 November to 12 December 2014, together with "Porquoi les Mathématiques?", exhibited for the first time in São Paulo. The event marked the beginning of the collaboration between Matemateca and the Maison des Mathématiques et de l'Informatique de Lyon.
 Virada Malba Tahan: 5 and 6 May 2017, at the IME itself with organization by the Centre for the Improvement of Mathematics Teaching.

See also 

 Institute of Mathematics and Statistics, University of São Paulo
 University of São Paulo
 Mathematics education

References

External links 

 Official homepage
 Government of Paraná: Matemateca: 'playing' to make mathematics happen

University of São Paulo
science museums in Brazil